Conger is a genus of marine congrid eels.  It includes some of the largest types of eels, ranging up to 2 m (6 ft) or more in length, in the case of the European conger. Large congers have often been observed by divers during the day in parts of the Mediterranean Sea, and both European and American congers are sometimes caught by fishermen along the European and North American Atlantic coasts.

The life histories of most conger eels are poorly known. Based on collections of their small leptocephalus larvae, the American conger eel has been found to spawn in the southwestern Sargasso Sea, close to the spawning areas of the Atlantic freshwater eels.

"Conger" or "conger eel" is sometimes included in the common names of species of the family Congridae, including members of this genus.

Description 
Congers have wide mouths with sturdy teeth, usually a variant of gray or black in coloration. They have no scales. Their body weight can reach over 57 kilograms (125 lbs).

Species
 Conger cinereus Rüppell, 1830 (longfin African conger)
 Conger conger (Linnaeus, 1758) (European conger)
 Conger erebennus (D. S. Jordan & Snyder, 1901) (Anaconger)
 Conger esculentus Poey, 1861 (grey conger)
 Conger macrocephalus Kanazawa, 1958
 Conger marginatus Valenciennes, 1850 (Hawaiian Mustache Conger)
 Conger melanopterus Kodeeswaran et al., 2023
 Conger myriaster (Brevoort, 1856) (whitespotted conger)
 Conger oceanicus (Mitchill, 1818) (American conger)
 Conger oligoporus Kanazawa, 1958
 Conger orbignianus Valenciennes, 1842 (Argentine conger)
 Conger philippinus Kanazawa, 1958
 Conger triporiceps Kanazawa, 1958 (manytooth conger)
 Conger verreauxi Kaup, 1856 (southern conger)
 Conger wilsoni (Bloch & J. G. Schneider, 1801) (Cape conger)

Formerly Included Species
 Conger anagoides Bleeker, 1853 (sea conger) - now Ariosoma anagoides
 Conger auratus Costa, 1844 (bandtooth conger) - now Ariosoma balearicum

Fishing
Fishing for congers is recorded in the 12th century. The Norman taxation Pipe Roll recorded two éperquerie on Guernsey and one on Sark. These were designated places where congers were dried.

One species of the conger eel, Conger myriaster, is an important food fish in East Asia. It is often served as sushi.

Behaviour
Congers are predators and can attack humans. The eel bit a large chunk from his face.

References

External links

 BOLDSystems: Genus Conger

 
Congridae
Extant Eocene first appearances
Taxa named by Lorenz Oken